Koumansetta rainfordi, the old glory or Court Jester goby, is a species of goby native to tropical reefs of the western Pacific Ocean where it occurs at depths of from .  This species can reach a length of  SL. It can also be found in the aquarium trade. The specific name honours the viticulturalist E. H. Rainford, of the Queensland Agricultural Department, who also collected specimens for the Australian Museum, and in 1924 he collected specimens of this species.

References

External links

 

rainfordi
Fish described in 1940